The Tasmanian Legislative Council has fifteen single member constituencies, called divisions.

Current divisions
The fifteen Tasmanian Legislative Council divisions as of the 2016-17 redistribution are:

Abolished Divisions

Apsley (1999–2017)
Brighton (1851–1856)
Buckingham (1851–1999)
Cambridge (1856–1946)
Campbell Town (1851–1856)
Cornwall (1851–1856, 1946–1999)
Cumberland (1851–1856)
Emu Bay (1997–1999)
Glamorgan (1855–1856)
Gordon (1899–1999)
Hobart Town (1851–1857)
Jordan (1856–1885)
Leven (1997–1999)
Longford (1853–1885)
Macquarie (1886–1999)
Meander (1856–1997)
Monmouth (1946–1999)
Morven (1855–1856)
Newdegate (1946–1999)
New Norfolk (1851–1856)
North Esk (1855–1901)
Paterson (1999–2008)
Queenborough (1947–1999)
Richmond (1851–1856)
Roland (1997–1999)
Rowallan (1999–2008)
Russell (1885–1999)
Sorell (1851–1856)
South Esk (1856–1999)
Tamar (1856–1997)
Wellington (1999–2008)
Westbury (1851–1856)
West Devon (1947–1997)
Western Tiers (2008–2017)
Westmorland (1885–1999)

Members

See also

 Tasmanian House of Assembly electoral divisions

References

External links
 Parliament of Tasmania
 Tasmanian Electoral Commission

 
Tasmanian Legislative Council